Ricardo Viñes y Roda (5 February 1875 – 29 April 1943) was a Spanish pianist. He gave the premieres of works by Ravel, Debussy, Satie, Falla and Albéniz. He was the piano teacher of the composer Francis Poulenc and the pianists Marcelle Meyer, Joaquín Nin-Culmell and Léo-Pol Morin.

Life and career
Viñes was born in Lleida, Spain. He studied the piano at the Paris Conservatoire under Charles-Wilfrid de Bériot, and composition and harmony with Benjamin Godard and Albert Lavignac.

In 1895 Viñes made his début at the Salle Pleyel, Paris. From 1900 he had an international career, touring in Russia and throughout Europe and South America. Between 1930 and 1936 he lived in Argentina, returning to Paris in 1936 where he continued to play until the final year of his life.

According to Charles Timbrell and Esperanza Berrocal in the Grove Dictionary of Music and Musicians, Viñes's keyboard technique was magnificent and his repertoire extensive. In addition to the established classics he championed new works by the many composers of whom he was a close friend. They included Ravel, Debussy, Satie, Falla, Granados, Albéniz and Déodat de Séverac.  He was also a proponent of Russian music, and introduced France to pieces by Mussorgsky (Pictures at an Exhibition), Balakirev (Islamey) and Prokofiev (Sarcasmes). Grove lists among the many works dedicated to him Ravel's Oiseaux tristes, Debussy's Poissons d’or and Falla's Noches en los jardines de España.

Viñes composed a small number of works, the best known of which are the two Hommages, for Séverac and Satie. He also wrote several articles, mostly on Spanish music, and his diaries are much quoted by biographers of his musical contemporaries. His piano students included Marcelle Meyer, Joaquín Nin-Culmell, Léo-Pol Morin and Francis Poulenc. Poulenc later said of his teacher:

An annual International piano competition "Ricard Viñes" has been held since 1995 in his birth town Lleida. The city council named one of the city's most popular squares the "Plaça Ricard Vinyes", and the main room of the Llotja de Lleida theatre and congress centre (opened in 2010) is also named after him.

Viñes died in Barcelona at the age of 68. He was unmarried.

Discography
Viñes reportedly had an intense dislike for the recording process, but nonetheless left 25 recordings dating from the 1930s. In Grove's view, the playing as recorded reveals "an unforced virtuosity, charming rhythmic pointing and shimmering pedal effects."

All the recordings listed below were released by Marston Records in 2007 as "Ricardo Viñes: The Complete Recordings". Other releases are listed below the individual compositions.
 Isaac Albéniz
 Granada (Serenata), Op.47 No.1 (rec. 1930)
 Torre bermeja, Op.92 No.12 (rec. 1930)
 Opal (Pearl), "Ricardo Viñes and Francis Planté", 1994
 Orientale, Op.232 No.2 (rec. 1930)
 Opal (Pearl), "Ricardo Viñes and Francis Planté", 1994
 Seguidillas, Op.232 No.5 (rec. 1930)
 Opal (Pearl), "Ricardo Viñes and Francis Planté", 1994
 Serenata española, Op.181 (rec. 22 July 1936)
 Opal (Pearl), "Ricardo Viñes and Francis Planté", 1994
 Tango in A minor, Op.164 No.2 (rec. 22 July 1936)
 Opal (Pearl), "Ricardo Viñes and Francis Planté", 1994
 Pedro Humberto Allende
 Dos Tonadas Chilenas (rec. 22 July 1936)
 Opal (Pearl), "Ricardo Viñes and Francis Planté", 1994
 Manuel Blancafort
 L'Orgue du Carroussel (from Le Parc d'Attractions) (rec. 1930)
 Opal (Pearl), "Ricardo Viñes and Francis Planté", 1994
 Polka de l'Equilibriste (from Le Parc d'Attractions) (rec. 1930)
 Opal (Pearl), "Ricardo Viñes and Francis Planté", 1994
 Alexander Borodin
 Scherzo in Ab (rec. 1930)
 Opal (Pearl), "Ricardo Viñes and Francis Planté", 1994
 Claude Debussy
 Soirée dans Grenade (Estampes No.2) (rec. 1930)
 Opal (Pearl), "Ricardo Viñes and Francis Planté", 1994
 Poissons d'or (Images, Set 2 No.3) (rec. 1930)
 Opal (Pearl), "Ricardo Viñes and Francis Planté", 1994
 Naxos, "A-Z of Pianists - by Jonathan Summers", 4-CD set, 2007
 Ysaÿe Records, "Claude Debussy - Images Pour Piano", 2008
 Hommage à Rameau (Images, Set 1 No.2) (incomplete; rec. 1938)
 Arbiter Records, "Masters of the French piano tradition", 2007
 Etude No.10, "Pour les sonorités opposées" (incomplete; rec. 1938)
 Arbiter Records, "Masters of the French piano tradition", 2007
 Viñes speaks on Debussy (radio address in French commemorating the 20th anniversary of Debussy's death, 1938)
 Manuel de Falla
 Dance of Terror (rec. 1930)
 Récit du Pêcheur (rec. 1930)
 Introduction and Ritual Fire Dance (rec. 1930)
 Gluck-Brahms
 Gavotte in A (rec. 1930)
 Opal (Pearl), "Ricardo Viñes and Francis Planté", 1994
 Carlos López-Buchardo
 Bailecito (rec. 22 July 1936)
 Opal (Pearl), "Ricardo Viñes and Francis Planté", 1994
 Domenico Scarlatti
 Sonata in D, K.29 (L.461) (rec. 1930)
 Opal (Pearl), "Ricardo Viñes and Francis Planté", 1994
 Cayetano Troiani
 Milonga (rec. 22 July 1936)
 Opal (Pearl), "Ricardo Viñes and Francis Planté", 1994
 Joaquín Turina
 Miramar (from Chants d'Espagne) (rec. 1930)
 Opal (Pearl), "Ricardo Viñes and Francis Planté", 1994
 Dans les Jardins de Murcia (rec. 1930)
 Opal (Pearl), "Ricardo Viñes and Francis Planté", 1994

Notes and references

Notes

References

Sources

External links
 

1875 births
1943 deaths
People from Lleida
Musicians from Catalonia
Spanish classical pianists
Male classical pianists
Spanish composers
Spanish male composers
Conservatoire de Paris alumni